Giorgio Galli may refer to:
 Giorgio Galli (footballer) (born 1996), Italian footballer
 Giorgio Galli (historian) (1928–2020), Italian political scientist, historian, and academic
Giorgio Galli (watchmaker), Milan-based creative director for Timex Group